Alexandra Höffgen (born 29 October 1993) is a German rower who competes in international level events. She is a double World U23 medalist and a double European medalist in the women's eights.

Höffgen was a former basketball player who played at the 2010 Summer Youth Olympics in Singapore where she finished eighth in the girls' basketball tournament before she switched to rowing in 2011.

References

External links
 
 
 
 

1993 births
Living people
Sportspeople from Dortmund
German female rowers
Basketball players at the 2010 Summer Youth Olympics
World Rowing Championships medalists for Germany
20th-century German women
21st-century German women